James George "Jim" Kates is a minor poet and a literary translator. He has been awarded three National Endowment for the Arts Fellowships, an Individual Artist Fellowship from the New Hampshire State Council on the Arts, the Cliff Becker Book Prize in Translation and a Käpylä Translation Prize. He has published three chapbooks of his own poems: Mappemonde (Oyster River Press) Metes and Bounds (Accents Publishing) and The Old Testament (Cold Hub Press) and two full books, The Briar Patch (Hobblebush Books) and Places of Permanent Shade (Accent). He is the translator of The Score of the Game  and An Offshoot of Sense (Tatiana Shcherbina); Say Thank You and Level with Us (Mikhail Aizenberg); When a Poet Sees a Chestnut Tree, Secret Wars, and I Have Invented Nothing (Jean-Pierre Rosnay); Corinthian Copper (Regina Derieva); Live by Fire (Aleksey Porvin); Thirty-nine Rooms (Nikolai Baitov); Psalms (Genrikh Sapgir); Muddy River (Sergey Stratanovsky); Selected Poems 1957-2009, and Sixty Years (Mikhail Yeryomin); and Paper-thin Skin (Aigerim Tazhi). He is the translation editor of Contemporary Russian Poetry, and the editor of In the Grip of Strange Thoughts: Russian Poetry in a New Era.

Career 
Since 1997, with Leora Zeitlin, Kates has co-directed Zephyr Press, a non-profit literary publishing house that focuses on contemporary works in translation from Russia, Eastern Europe, and Asia.  He is the translation editor of Contemporary Russian Poetry, and the editor of In the Grip of Strange Thoughts: Russian Poetry in a New Era. He was the president of the American Literary Translators Association.

Life 
Kates grew up in Elmsford and White Plains, New York. He attended Hackley School in Tarrytown and graduated from White Plains High School in 1963. He volunteered for the Mississippi Summer Project after his freshman year at Wesleyan University in 1964, helping to implement a special court order encouraging voter registration in Panola County. In the fall of 1964, he organized a Friends of the SNCC/COFO in Paris, France, to support the work of the American civil rights movement. He returned to America in 1965 to work in Natchez, Mississippi. He later became a public school teacher, a non-violence trainer for interpersonal and political movements, and a poet and literary translator.

He is married to Helen Safronsky Kates. They have two children, Stanislav (1986) and Paula (1994).

Awards 
 1984 National Endowment for the Arts Creative Writing Fellowship in Poetry
 1995 Individual Artist Fellowship from the New Hampshire State Council on the Arts
 2006 National Endowment for the Arts Translation Project Fellowship
 2013	Cliff Becker Book Prize in Translation
 2017  National Endowment for the Arts, Translation Project Fellowship
 2018  Käpylä Translation Prize 
 2022  Der Hovanessian Prize in Translation

Published works

poetry

 Mappemonde (Oyster River Press)  
 Metes and Bounds (Accents Publishing) 
 The Old Testament (Cold Hub Press)  
 The Briar Patch (Hobblebush Books)  
 Places of Permanent Shade (Accents Publishing)

translations

 Sixty Years (poems by Mikhail Yeryomin) Black Widow Press: 2022
 Paper-thin Skin (poems by Aigerim Tazhi) Zephyr Press: 2019
 I Have Invented Nothing (poems by Jean-Pierre Rosnay) Black Widow Press: 2018
 Muddy River (poems by Sergey Stratanovsky) Carcanet Press: 2016
 Thirty-nine Rooms (a poem by Nikolai Baitov) Cold Hub Press: 2015
 Selected Poems 1957-2004 (poems by Mikhail Yeryomin) White Pine Press: 2014
 Psalms 1965-1966 (poems by Genrikh Sapgir) Cold Hub Press: 2012
 A Voice Among the Multitudes: Jewish Poets from Latin America, with Stephen A. Sadow,  Northeastern University Libraries: 2011
 Live by Fire (poems by Aleksey Porvin) Cold Hub Press: 2011
 An Offshoot of Sense (poems by Tatiana Shcherbina) Cold Hub Press: 2011
 Level with Us (poems by Mikhail Aizenberg) Cold Hub Press: 2011
 Corinthian Copper (poems by Regina Derieva) Marick Press: 2010
 Secret Wars (poems by Jean-Pierre Rosnay) Cold Hub Press: 2010
 When a Poet Sees a Chestnut Tree (poems by Jean-Pierre Rosnay) Green Integer Press: 2009
 Contemporary Russian Poetry (translations editor) Dalkey Archive Press: 2008
 Say Thank You (poems by Mikhail Aizenberg) Zephyr Press: 2007
 Less Than a Meter (poems by Mikhail Aizenberg) Ugly Duckling Presse: 2004
 Las Edades / The Ages (poems by Ricardo Feierstein, with Stephen A. Sadow) Colleción Poesía: 2004
 The Score of the Game (poems by Tatiana Shcherbina) Zephyr Press: 2003
 Self-Portraits and Masks (poems by Isaac Goldemberg, with Stephen A. Sadow) Cross-Cultural Communications: 2002
 In the Grip of Strange Thoughts: Russian Poetry in a New Era (editor) Zephyr Press: 1999
 We, the Generation in the Wilderness (poems by Ricardo Feierstein, with Stephen A. Sadow) Ford-Brown Press: 1989

1945 births
Living people
American male poets
American translators